The Central Church College Conference (CCCC) was an intercollegiate athletic football conference that existed from 1951 and 1957. Its membership was centered on the states of Missouri and Nebraska.

Champions

1951 – 
1952 – 
1953 – 
1954 – 
1955 – 
1956 – 
1957 –

See also
List of defunct college football conferences

References